Copper Creek Falls is a waterfall from Copper Creek, just before it empties into Eagle Creek at Bench Canyon, in Union County, Oregon.

See also 
 List of waterfalls in Oregon

References

Waterfalls of Oregon
Landforms of Union County, Oregon